The High Commissioner of Australia to Brunei is an officer of the Australian Department of Foreign Affairs and Trade and the head of the High Commission of the Commonwealth of Australia in Brunei. The position has the rank and status of an Ambassador Extraordinary and Plenipotentiary and is currently held by Luke Arnold since January 2022. There has been a resident Australian High Commissioner in Brunei since March 1983.

Posting history
The reporting responsibility for the British Protectorate of Brunei was originally held by the Australian office in Singapore, with a "Commissioner for Malaya and South-East Asia" appointed in 1946. On 7 April 1956, Ralph Harry took up his appointment in Singapore as the Australian Commissioner for Singapore, Brunei, Sarawak, and North Borneo. With the formation of the Federation of Malaysia on 16 September 1963, the Australian Commission in Singapore became a subordinate Deputy High Commission to the new High Commission in Kuala Lumpur, and responsibility for Brunei, which remained a British protectorate outside of Malaysia, was transferred to the high commission.

On 30 July 1979, the Australian High Commissioner to Malaysia in Kuala Lumpur, was appointed as the non-resident Commissioner to Brunei, with a stated purpose to "facilitate contacts and closer cooperation with the Government of Brunei during the period leading up to Brunei's full independence in 1983". A resident Australian Commission in Brunei was established in March 1983 headed by John Monfries, in anticipation of Brunei's independence on 1 January 1984. When Brunei gained its independence, the Australian mission became a High Commission.

Heads of mission

References

External links

Australian High Commission, Brunei Darussalam

 
Brunei
Australia